In enzymology, a hamamelose kinase is an enzyme that catalyzes the chemical reaction

ATP + D-hamamelose  ADP + D-hamamelose 2'-phosphate

Thus, the two substrates of this enzyme are ATP and D-hamamelose, whereas its two products are ADP and D-hamamelose 2'-phosphate.

This enzyme belongs to the family of transferases, specifically those transferring phosphorus-containing groups (phosphotransferases) with an alcohol group as acceptor.  The systematic name of this enzyme class is ATP:D-hamamelose 2'-phosphotransferase. Other names in common use include hamamelose kinase (phosphorylating), hamamelosekinase (ATP: hamamelose 2'-phosphotransferase), and ATP/hamamelose 2'-phosphotransferase.

References

 

EC 2.7.1
Enzymes of unknown structure